Chuck Rosenthal (sometimes writes as C.P. Rosenthal) is an American novelist and short story writer. Since the 1980s, he has published seven novels and a memoir. He is married to the poet Gail Wronsky and has one child, Marlena Rosenthal. He is a Professor of English at Loyola Marymount University.

Bibliography

Loop Trilogy
Loop's Progress (Hollyridge Press) 
Experiments in Life and Deaf (Hollyridge Press) 
Loop's End (Hollyridge Press)

Other Fiction
Elena of the Stars (out of print) (Based on his daughter Marlena Rosentha)l 
Jack Kerouac's Avatar Angel: His Last Novel (Hollyridge Press) 
My Mistress, Humanity (Hollyridge Press) 
Never Let Me Go: A Memoir (Red Hen Press) 
The Heart of Mars (Hollyridge Press) (2007)  (sequel to My Mistress, Humanity)
You Can Fly, A Sequel to the Peter Pan Tales (Hollyridge Press)l 
The Legend of La Diosa , a novel (Letters at 3 a.m. Press) 
The Shortest Farewells Are the Best, Noir Flash Fictions with Gail Wronsky (What Books Press) 
Ten Thousand Heavens, a novel (Whitepoint Press) 
Coyote O’Donohughe’s History of Texas, a novel (What Books Press)

Nonfiction

Never Let Me Go: A Memoir (Red Hen Press) 
West of Eden: A Life in 21st Century Los Angeles (What Books Press) 
Are We Not There Yet? Travels in Nepal, North India, and Bhutan (What Books Press) 
Tomorrow You'll Be One of Us: Sci Fi Poems with Gail Wronsky (What Books Press)

External links
Loyal Marymount faculty profile
A review of Rosenthal's Heart of Mars

Year of birth missing (living people)
Living people
20th-century American novelists
21st-century American novelists
American male novelists
20th-century American male writers
21st-century American male writers